Kleebach is a  left tributary of the Lahn river in central Hesse, Germany. It originates in the most Eastern part of the Hintertaunus mountains and from there it flows mostly in Northern direction towards the Lahn River. Along its course it flows through a string of small villages surrounded by small forests and fields.

See also
List of rivers of Hesse

References

Rivers of Hesse
Rivers of the Taunus
Rivers of Germany